The Development is a book of interrelated short stories by American writer John Barth, published in 2008.  The stories are set in the Heron Bay Estates gated community for the elderly in Maryland Tidewater.

Stories

 "Peeping Tom"
 "Toga Party"
 "Teardown"
 "The Bard Award"
 "Progressive Dinner"
 "Us/Them"
 "Assisted Living"
 "The End"
 "Rebeginning"

References

Works cited

Further reading

 
 

2008 books
2008 short story collections
Novels by John Barth
Novels set in Maryland
Houghton Mifflin books